Strange Occurrence is an American post-grunge band formed in 1995 in Seattle, Washington. Their internationally distributed album: Another Day to Start Again (Steelroots/Flicker, 2002) was received well by critics and radio. Before signing with Steelroots Records, they had been voted as one of the top 25 independent bands of 2001 by readers of 7 Ball Magazine. They are most notable for their single Reach which peaked at No. 6 on Radio & Records CR chart. Strange Occurrence disbanded in 2004.

Members
 TJ Harris - vocals
 Eric Vickers - bass
 Joe Wiles - guitar
 Mike Middleton - drums

Past members

 Paul McGuire - guitar (2002–2003)
 Gabe Roberts - guitar (2000–2001)
 Zack Phillips - drums (1995–2001)
 Derek Olson - vocals (1998–2000)
 Dallas Olson - guitar (1998–2000)
 Craig Wickstrom - vocals, guitar (1997–1998)
 Josh Muehlendorf - vocals, guitar (1996–1997)
 Reid Smith - guitar (1996)
 Chris Wiles - vocals (1994–1996)

Discography
Another Day to Start Again - Independent EP (2000)
Another Day to Start Again - Steelroots full-length (2002)
The Acoustic Sessions - Steelroots (2003)

Compilations
31 Flavors: Sample the Flavor (1997)
Simply Groovy New Music Sampler (2002)
What Are You Listening To?: Hard Rock and Nu-Metal (2002)

References

American post-grunge musical groups